Abtabeh, also called ābdasta (Persian: āb – water and dasta – handle) is a pitcher made out of clay, copper, brass, or plastic which is used traditionally for purposes of hand washing, cleansing, and ablution. Its overall shape is similar to a ewer with an angled spout protruding from its side, from where water is poured. It shares resemblance with lota and kindi in Indian culture.

Aftebehs are common in Iran, Afghanistan, Azerbaijan, and Central Asian countries. In Uzbekistan, the vessel is mostly called ābdasta, but the term āftoba is common in Namangan and Andijan regions. Aftabehs are called ibriq in Qashqadaryo Region. Aftabehs are also similar to the lota used in Pakistan which have the same uses and are also used to clean the rear of a human as prescribed in Sharia which are the religious laws of Islam.

Aftabeh is now mostly an accessory in toilets and used inside the bathroom alongside health faucets. Aftabeh has been used within Persia and the wider Central Asian region throughout history and many historical aftabehs, particularly elaborately decorated ones are on display at museums around the world as historical artifacts with cultural and artistic value.

Aftabeh-Lagan

In Qajar era, it was customary for affluent families to have servants bring a set of brass or copper aftabeh-lagan (pitcher and wash basin) so everyone could wash their hands and face before food was served. Similarly, in rural areas of Central Asia guests are still offered an aftabeh (with a lagan or a basin) and a towel for washing hands before and after eating.

There is a popular Persian proverb associated with aftabeh-lagan: "7 sets of aftabeh-lagan, but no lunch or dinner!" which refers to an empty show of opulence around a subject where the actual content is missing.

References

External links
 An aftabeh in Brooklyn Museum
A decorated brass aftabeh with Persian motifs at National Museum of Scotland
Finely engraved Qajar-era aftabeh at State Hermitage Museum, Saint Petersburg, Russia
 Decorated brass aftabeh with poetic and benedictory inscriptions at Victoria and Albert (V&A) Museum, London

Hygiene
Sanitation
Liquid containers
Containers
Iranian culture
Persian words and phrases